Raúl "Chato" Padilla Mendoza (17 June 1918 – 3 February 1994) was a Mexican actor, and a member of Chespirito's comedy troupe, famous for his character in El Chavo del Ocho, Jaimito, el Cartero ("Jaimito, the Mailman").

Career
Padilla joined the show in 1979 following the departure of Ramón Valdés, gradually taking over the sorts of roles Valdés used to play. He also worked on the film El Chanfle, scripted and starred by Chespirito. Padilla's second major character was that of Licenciado Morales, who was in charge of the local police station in Los Caquitos.

Death

Raúl died of a heart attack on February 3, 1994, at age 77. His nickname, "Chato", means "pug"; the nickname was in reference to his broad, flat nose. His son, Raul Padilla Jr. "El Choforo" also worked with Chespirito and was an actor in his own right, he died on February 3, 2013, at age 73.

Filmography

Notes

Chespirito actors
Mexican male film actors
Mexican male stage actors
Mexican male television actors
Male actors from Monterrey
1916 births
1994 deaths
20th-century Mexican male actors